Juventus Atlético Clube, commonly known as Juventus, is a Brazilian football club based in Santa Rosa, Rio Grande do Sul state.

History
The club was founded on March 12, 1951. The club closed its football department in the 1970s, only reopening it in 1997 to compete in the Campeonato Gaúcho Second Level.

Stadium
Juventus Atlético Clube play their home games at Estádio Municipal Carlos Denardin. The stadium has a maximum capacity of 3,500 people.

References

 
Association football clubs established in 1951
Football clubs in Rio Grande do Sul
1951 establishments in Brazil